Did You Know may refer to:

Did You Know...?, an advertising campaign for GEICO
"Did You Know", 2016 single by Pauly D

See also
 Do You Know (disambiguation)
 DYK (disambiguation)
 "How Did You Know", a single by electronic dance music producer and remixer Kurtis Mantronik
 "Mary, Did You Know?", a Christmas song with lyrics written by Mark Lowry and music written by Buddy Greene
 Did You Know Gaming?, a video game–focused blog about video game related trivia and facts
 Did You Know People Can Fly?, the debut album by Kaddisfly